The Japan–United States women's soccer rivalry is a sports rivalry between the national women's football (soccer) teams of Japan and the United States, two of the most successful women's football nations in the world, having achieved eight straight Women's World Cup appearances between the two countries. However, the United States has dominated Japan since 1986, having won 28 of the 37 matches. The U.S. maintained a 13-match winning streak from 1986 through 2000. Japan upsets the U.S. 1–0, their first ever win in regulation for Japan, and subsequently the Algarve Cup final against Germany, but finished as the runners-up after a 4–3 loss.

Japan and the United States have played against each other four times in the Women's World Cup. Most notably, the 2011 World Cup Final in which Japan won 3–1 on penalties, after a 2–2 draw in extra time, and the 2015 World Cup Final, winning 5–2 by the U.S., as well as the gold medal game at the 2012 Summer Olympics, winning 2–1 also by the U.S., the quarterfinals of the 1995 World Cup, and the final group stage match of the 1991 World Cup. Overall, the U.S. has won four World Cups in 1991, 1999, 2015, and 2019, while Japan has won one World Cup in 2011.

The last meeting was on 11 March 2020 at Toyota Stadium in Frisco, Texas, United States (2020 SheBelieves Cup).

History

Early encounters
The first meeting of the teams occurred on July 25, 1986 at the Mundialito in Jesolo, Italy. The United States secured a 3–1 win, with one goal from April Heinrichs and a double from substitute Marcia McDermott. Futaba Kioka scored for Japan. At the Women's World Invitational Tournament (known as the Chunghua Cup), staged by Taiwan in December 1987, the United States beat Japan 1–0 with a goal scored by the defender Lori Henry.

The United States defeated Japan 5–2 at the 1988 FIFA Women's Invitation Tournament in Panyu on June 1, 1988, as Carin Jennings-Gabarra scored a hat-trick. American coach Anson Dorrance characterized the Japan of that era as: "a team that was equally inexperienced like we were but lacking our athleticism and size".

After comfortable wins over Japan at both the 1991 and 1995 editions of the FIFA Women's World Cup, 3–0 and 4–0 respectively, the United States embarked on a three-match tour of Japan in May 1998. Coach Tony DiCicco described Japan as "one of our major Asian challengers" and "one of the most improved teams since the 1991 World Cup". The United States won all three games and when Japan attended Charlotte, North Carolina for another friendly in April 1999 DiCicco's team inflicted a record-equalling 9–0 defeat.

Japan avoided defeat by the United States for the first time on the occasion of their 14th meeting, a 1–1 friendly match at Bank One Ballpark in Phoenix, Arizona on 17 December 2000. The game was arranged as a farewell fixture for the retiring Carla Overbeck. A fatigued United States team, playing in a record 41st match of the year, dominated but conceded an equalizer to Homare Sawa after Brandi Chastain's opener.

The next two friendly fixtures were also drawn as Japan began a gradual transition of "going from pushover to potent rival".

Respectful rivalry
The formerly one-sided rivalry became closer in the period following Japan's upset penalty shoot-out win in the 2011 FIFA Women's World Cup Final. Even while contesting three major tournament finals in four years, the teams' rivalry remained conspicuously respectful. In the immediate aftermath of the 2011 final, Carli Lloyd graciously congratulated the winners. While Aya Miyama delayed her participation in the celebrations to hug her defeated opponents. 

Japan's 2011 captain Homare Sawa was particularly well disposed towards the United States as she had enjoyed several years living and playing professional soccer there. Sawa reflected the culture of the Japanese team, which has been described as "polite restraint" and contrasted with the more forthright culture of the American team. She had formed an enduring friendship with American center-forward Abby Wambach when the two played together at Washington Freedom.

In March 2012 Japan secured their first ever win (within regulation time) against the United States, in Faro, Portugal at the 2012 Algarve Cup. Megumi Takase's headed 84th-minute goal secured a 1–0 victory and Japan's progression to the final. In April 2012 the United States travelled to play a friendly match in Japan, where they visited the area affected by the 2011 Tōhoku earthquake and tsunami and left gifts for local schoolchildren. Although the match was drawn, American players including Carli Lloyd and Heather O'Reilly conceded that the Japanese players had superior technique while the Americans relied on fitness and aggression.

List of matches

Major tournaments

1991 FIFA Women's World Cup

1995 FIFA Women's World Cup

2011 FIFA Women's World Cup

2012 Summer Olympics

2015 FIFA Women's World Cup

Statistics

See also
 Canada–United States sports rivalries#Soccer
 Japan–South Korea football rivalry
 Japan–United States relations
 Mexico–United States soccer rivalry#Women's football
 Japan women's national football team results and fixtures on German Wikipedia
 United States women's national soccer team results and fixtures on German Wikipedia

Notes

References

International association football rivalries
Japan at the 2011 FIFA Women's World Cup
Japan at the 2012 Women's Olympic Football Tournament
Japan at the 2015 FIFA Women's World Cup
Japan women's national football team
Japan–United States relations
Rivalry in women's sports
United States at the 1991 FIFA Women's World Cup
United States at the 1995 FIFA Women's World Cup
United States at the 2011 FIFA Women's World Cup
United States at the 2012 Women's Olympic Football Tournament
United States at the 2015 FIFA Women's World Cup
United States women's national soccer team